Ernst Blum (25 January 1904 – 17 May 1980) was a German international footballer.

References

1904 births
1980 deaths
Association football midfielders
German footballers
Germany international footballers
VfB Stuttgart players